Tres Lagunas is a city in Formosa Province, Argentina. As of the 2001 INDEC census, the population was 1,237 and was an increase from 1991 census of 612 population.

References 
The information in this article is based on that in its Spanish equivalent.

Populated places in Formosa Province